Helder Mota Ricardo, also known as Eric (born 1 August 1977) is an East Timorese former footballer who plays as midfielder for Ad. Dili Leste and the Timor-Leste national football team.

References

External links

1977 births
Living people
Association football midfielders
East Timorese footballers
Timor-Leste international footballers
A.D. Dili Leste footballers